Emmanuel Tardif (also known as Emmanuel Gendron-Tardif) is a Canadian film director and screenwriter from Quebec. He is most noted for his 2022 film In Broad Daylight (Au grand jour), which premiered in the Proxima competition for emerging filmmakers at the 56th Karlovy Vary International Film Festival.

An alumnus of Concordia University, Tardif made the short films Desire (2015), Miami (2016) and Sunrise (2016) before releasing his full-length debut film Speak Love in 2019. He followed up in 2021 with Heirdoms (Soumissions).

With Léa Roy and Marie-Élaine Bédard, Tardif formed the production company Les Rapailleurs.

On January 26, 2023, Tardif was charged with second-degree murder in the death of his mother, Lysane Gendron, who was found dead in a Fullum Street apartment in Montreal on January 25. His arrest scuppered the planned commercial release of In Broad Daylight.

References

External links

21st-century Canadian screenwriters
21st-century Canadian male writers
Canadian male screenwriters
Canadian screenwriters in French
Film directors from Quebec
Writers from Quebec
French Quebecers
Concordia University alumni
Living people
Year of birth missing (living people)